Spring Gully is a suburb of the regional city of Bendigo in north central Victoria, Australia,  south of the Bendigo city centre.

References

External links

Towns in Victoria (Australia)
Bendigo